Pinnacle Country Club is a private country club and golf course in the Southern United States, located in Rogers, Arkansas, within the Northwest Arkansas metro.

Founded  in 1988 as Champions Country Club, the course opened in 1990. Originally designed by Don Sechrest and tour pro Bruce Lietzke,  it was redesigned by Randy Heckenkemper in 2008.

Tour events
Pinnacle has hosted the Walmart NW Arkansas Championship on the LPGA Tour since its debut in 2007.

Amenities
The club includes six tennis courts (five clay, one hardcourt) and a swimming pool.

Course
Back tees

References

External links

Golf clubs and courses in Arkansas
Sports organizations established in 1988
Sports venues in Arkansas
1988 establishments in Arkansas